Lusutrombopag, sold under the brand name Mulpleta among others, is a medication that has been developed for certain conditions that lead to thrombocytopenia (abnormally low platelet counts) such as thrombocytopenia associated with chronic liver disease in patients prior to elective invasive procedures. It is being manufactured and marketed in Japan by Shionogi. It was approved by the U.S. Food and Drug Administration (FDA) in July 2018, and NICE in January 2020.

It was approved for medical use in the European Union in February 2019.

References

External links 
 

Drugs acting on the blood and blood forming organs
Orphan drugs
Thrombopoietin receptor agonists
Thiazoles
Chloroarenes
Carboxylic acids
Japanese inventions
Carboxamides
Ethers